Sisi (stylized as SiSi; originally si si) is the brand name of a wide range of fruit-flavoured beverages produced by  Dutch beverage manufacturing company Vrumona under a joint venture with Heineken International since 1951. The manufacturing plant is located at Bunnik, The Netherlands.

In 1936, George Becht launched a grapefruit-flavoured drink called Ja-Ja. One year later, an apple-flavoured drink was launched under the si si name. After George Becht died in 1949, his son Cornelius took over and adopted the "si si" name to the similar products of the company Vrumona.

Between 1951 and 1969 there were a number of similarly named drinks, including Cas-Si (blackcurrant), Ceri-Se (cherry) and Grapy (grapefruit). In 1969, the name Si si was changed to one word, Sisi. These were later brought under the SiSi name: Cas-Si became SiSi cassis (blackcurrant), Ceri-Se became SiSi Cerise (cherry) and Grapy became Sisi grapefruit. In 1987, these flavours were purchased by another company and relaunched under the name Royal Club.

In 1957, cabaret singer Wim Sonneveld on Radio Luxembourg sung the company's first jingle "ome Daan the Si-Si-liaan". In 1972, and 1973, two well known Dutch actors, John Kraaijkamp sr. and Rijk de Gooijer, acted in some television commercials for the brand. Since the early 1990s, the company has used the slogan "Take it easy, take a SiSi". In recent years, Sisi has touted itself as having half as much sugar as similar products produced by its competitors.

References

External links 

 

Citrus sodas
Soft drinks
Heineken
Products introduced in 1936